Chelaeothrips is a genus of thrips in the family Phlaeothripidae.

Species
 Chelaeothrips annamensis
 Chelaeothrips exunguis

References

Phlaeothripidae
Thrips
Thrips genera